UFC Fight Night: Hermansson vs. Weidman was a planned mixed martial arts event produced by the Ultimate Fighting Championship originally planned to take place on May 2, 2020 at Chesapeake Energy Arena in Oklahoma City, Oklahoma, United States. Due to the COVID-19 pandemic in Oklahoma, UFC president Dana White announced on April 9 that starting with UFC 249, all future events were indefinitely postponed. The event was officially cancelled on April 20.

Background
The event would be the third that the promotion has contested in Oklahoma City, following UFC Fight Night: Diaz vs. Guillard in September 2009 and UFC Fight Night: Chiesa vs. Lee in June 2017.

A middleweight bout between former UFC Middleweight Champion Chris Weidman and Jack Hermansson had been slated to serve as the event headliner.

A women's bantamweight bout between Sarah Alpar and Duda Santana was scheduled for the event. However, Santana was removed from the event for undisclosed reasons and replaced by Vanessa Melo.

A women's bantamweight bout between Julia Avila and Karol Rosa was expected to take place at UFC Fight Night: Overeem vs. Harris. However, the event was cancelled due to the COVID-19 pandemic. The pairing was rescheduled for this event.

Due to travel restrictions related to the COVID-19 pandemic, some Brazilian fighters were unable to compete due to visa issues on the original date – Marina Rodriguez (who was expected to face former UFC Women's Strawweight Championship challenger Cláudia Gadelha) and Vanessa Melo (who was expected to replace Santana against Alpar).

Cancelled fight card

See also 

 List of UFC events
 List of current UFC fighters
 2020 in UFC

References 
 

UFC Fight Night
Mixed martial arts in Oklahoma
Sports in Oklahoma City
May 2020 sports events in the United States
2020 in mixed martial arts
2020 in sports in Oklahoma
Cancelled Ultimate Fighting Championship events
Sports events cancelled due to the COVID-19 pandemic